Eve-Külli Kala (born 10 November 1959 in Tartu) is an Estonian diplomat.

She has graduated from Tallinn Pedagogical University in English and German philology, and also graduated from Estonian School of Diplomacy. Since 1992 she has worked for Estonian Foreign Ministry.

2002-2006 she was Ambassador of Estonia to Czech Republic. Since 2010 she was Ambassador of Estonia to Slovakia.

Awards: 
 2007: Order of the White Star, IV class.

References

Living people
1959 births
Estonian women diplomats
Ambassadors of Estonia to the Czech Republic
Ambassadors of Estonia to Slovakia
Recipients of the Order of the White Star, 4th Class
Tallinn University alumni